Bembidion tetracolum is a species of ground beetle native to Europe.

References

tetracolum
Beetles described in 1825
Beetles of Europe